Wycombe High School is a girls' grammar school in High Wycombe, Buckinghamshire taking girls from the age of 11 to 18. The school became an academy in 2011, and in 2020 had 1,308 pupils.

History
The school was the first state grammar school for girls in Buckinghamshire when it opened in 1901 with eighteen pupils.

In 1901, the school was housed in the Clock House in Frogmoor, High Wycombe. At that time, enrolment was 18 fee-paying pupils and three staff. Miss Mary Christie M.A. was the first headmistress.

The school moved to Benjamin Road in 1906 where it remained for 50 years, except for a time during the First World War when it was evacuated to the old grammar school so that the Benjamin Road buildings could be used as a military hospital. By 1922 the school had 300 pupils and was rapidly expanding. The school acquired its status as a Voluntary Controlled girl's grammar school in 1944. By 1956 the number of girls wishing to attend the school was so great that the school moved again to new premises that were built at the present site on Marlow Hill.

It won the BBC Radio quiz show Top of the Form in 1958 and 1980.

In September 2005, the Department for Education and Skills (DfES) awarded the school specialist school status in Mathematics & Computing.

Over the years, buildings have been added to the school, such as Technology, Sport and Drama blocks. These were built to allow for the extra 300 pupils and staff that arrived when Lady Verney High School joined with Wycombe High in 1993. The most recent addition is a new music centre which opened in the summer term in 2015. The school houses a well-resourced library, conference facilities, and the school archive.

Curriculum
Subjects taught at Wycombe High School from Year 7 are: English, Maths, Science, Art, Spanish,  History, Geography, French, Latin, Religious Studies, Physical Education, Drama and Technology (alternating between Graphics, Textiles and Food throughout the year).

Notable former pupils

 Julia Bone, tennis player
 Rita Clifton CBE, advertising executive
 Gladys Colton, headmistress of City of London School for Girls, 1949 to 1972
 Lucinda Dryzek, actress
 Monica Felton, writer, town planner, feminist and social activist
 Isa Guha, England cricketer
 E. L. James, author of Fifty Shades of Grey
 Penny Jamieson, Bishop of Dunedin, New Zealand
 Shan Morgan CMG, British diplomat
Marion McQuillan (1921 – 1998), British metallurgist who specialised in the engineering uses for titanium and its alloys
 Rachel Burden, journalist and radio / TV presenter

References

External links

Department for Education Performance Tables 2011

Girls' schools in Buckinghamshire
Grammar schools in Buckinghamshire
High Wycombe
Educational institutions established in 1901
Academies in Buckinghamshire
1901 establishments in England